Anthony D. Gonsolin (born May 14, 1994) is an American professional baseball pitcher for the Los Angeles Dodgers of Major League Baseball (MLB). He played college baseball for the Saint Mary's Gaels. He was drafted by the Dodgers in the ninth round of the 2016 Major League Baseball draft, and made his MLB debut in 2019.

Early life and amateur career
Gonsolin attended Vacaville High School in Vacaville, California. As a senior, he went 4–1 with a 2.60 earned run average (ERA). After going undrafted in the 2012 MLB draft, he enrolled and played college baseball at St. Mary's College of California. As a senior in 2016, he pitched to a 3–3 record with a 3.86 ERA in 18 games. He was drafted by the Los Angeles Dodgers in the ninth round of the 2016 MLB draft.

Professional career

Minor leagues 
Gonsolin spent his first professional season with the Ogden Raptors and Great Lakes Loons, pitching to a combined 1–2 record with a 3.77 ERA in 19 relief appearances. He spent 2017 with Great Lakes and the Rancho Cucamonga Quakes, where he went 7–6 with a 3.86 ERA in 42 games. After spending his first two seasons as a relief pitcher, he was converted into a starter in 2018. He started the season with Rancho Cucamonga and was promoted to the Tulsa Drillers during the season. In 26 starts with both teams, he went 10–2 with a 2.60 ERA. The Dodgers named him as the organization's minor league pitcher of the year for 2018.

Major leagues 
Gonsolin began 2019 with the Oklahoma City Dodgers, and was called up to the Dodgers on June 26 to make his debut as the starting pitcher against the Arizona Diamondbacks. He pitched four innings, allowing six runs (four earned) on six hits with three strikeouts. He also singled to center field in his first major league at bat. On July 30, in his second MLB game, Gonsolin picked up his first career save against the Colorado Rockies after pitching four innings of relief in a 9–4 win. On August 5, Gonsolin picked up his first major league win after pitching six shutout innings against the St. Louis Cardinals. He allowed only two hits and one walk, while striking out seven batters. He pitched 40 innings in 11 games for the Dodgers, with six starts, and finished with a 4–2 record and a 2.93 ERA.

In the pandemic-shortened 2020 regular season, Gonsolin went 2–2 with a 2.31 ERA, in nine games (eight starts) during which he struck out 46 batters in  innings. In the postseason, he made two appearances in the NLCS, starting game two and appearing in relief in game seven. He pitched a total of 6 innings, allowing seven runs and picking up the loss in game two. In the World Series, he was selected by Dodgers manager Dave Roberts to start Game 2, on two days rest, against the Tampa Bay Rays. He only pitched  innings in the game and allowed one earned run on one hit and one walk as he was awarded the loss in the game. He also got the start in Game 6 and this time pitched  innings while allowing one run on three hits and two walks; however, the Dodgers came from behind to win that game and clinch the championship. Gonsolin received eleven votes in 2020 National League Rookie of the Year voting, finishing in fourth place. On October 26, 2020, Baseball America named Gonsolin its 2020 Rookie of the Year.

Gonsolin began the 2021 season on the Opening Day roster but did not appear in a game before he was placed on the injured list on April 4 with right shoulder inflammation. After a few rehab starts, he was activated on June 9 to rejoin the Dodgers starting rotation. His shoulder started hurting again towards the end of July and he was put back on the injured list on July 31. After missing another month, he returned on September 9. He made 13 starts (and two relief appearances) for the Dodgers in 2021, with a 4–1 record and a 3.23 ERA. Gonsolin made three relief appearances in the 2021 NLCS, allowing five runs on five hits in four innings.

After starting the 2022 season with 11 wins and no losses and a 2.02 ERA, Gonsolin was selected to the 2022 Major League Baseball All-Star Game. However, he allowed three runs on four hits (including two home runs) to pick up the loss in the game. At the end of August, Gonsolin was placed on the injured list with a forearm strain. He spent the next month recovering and did not return until he made a start on October 3rd, the second to last day of the regular season. Despite this, his season numbers were a career best. He finished 16–1 with a 2.14 ERA and 119 strikeouts.

On January 31, 2023, Gonsolin signed a two-year, $6.65 million, contract to avoid salary arbitration.

See also
 List of World Series starting pitchers

References

External links

1994 births
Living people
People from Vacaville, California
Baseball players from California
Major League Baseball pitchers
Los Angeles Dodgers players
National League All-Stars
Saint Mary's Gaels baseball players
Ogden Raptors players
Great Lakes Loons players
Rancho Cucamonga Quakes players
Tulsa Drillers players
Oklahoma City Dodgers players
Madison Mallards players